Pseudogekko brevipes, also known as Luzon false gecko or orange-spotted smooth-scaled gecko is a species of geckos. It is endemic to central Philippines, where it is found on several islands in dipterocarp and submontane forest at elevations of 300 to 1100 m above sea level.

References 

Pseudogekko
Reptiles described in 1867
Reptiles of the Philippines